Pritykino is a rural locality (a village) in Pyatovskoye Rural Settlement, Totemsky  District, Vologda Oblast, Russia. The population was 8 as of 2002.

Geography 
Pritykino is located 3 km southwest of Totma (the district's administrative centre) by road. Totma is the nearest rural locality.

References 

Rural localities in Tarnogsky District